Frank Wydo (June 15, 1924February 17, 1979) was an American football tackle who played eleven seasons in the National Football League for the Pittsburgh Steelers and the Philadelphia Eagles.

External links

1924 births
1979 deaths
People from Fayette County, Pennsylvania
Players of American football from Pennsylvania
American football offensive linemen
Cornell Big Red football players
Pittsburgh Steelers players
Philadelphia Eagles players